Marek Osinski is an electrical engineer at the University of New Mexico in Albuquerque. He was named a Fellow of the Institute of Electrical and Electronics Engineers (IEEE) in 2015 for his contributions to the analysis of optoelectronic materials and devices.

References

Fellow Members of the IEEE
Living people
Year of birth missing (living people)
Place of birth missing (living people)
American electrical engineers